Taraneh Javanbakht (born 12 May 1974) is an Iranian scientist and polymath.

Early life and education
Javanbakht was born in Tehran in 1974 and grew up there. She first graduated with a degree in Chemistry from the University of Shahid Beheshti in 1996. In 2002 she was awarded her first PhD in physical chemistry from the Pierre and Marie Curie University. She moved to the University of Montreal to continue her postdoctoral work. Whilst in Canada, Javanbakht has studied for additional Masters qualifications at Université du Québec à Montréal: for molecular biology in 2011 and for the study of logic in the Department of Philosophy in 2016.

Research
Javanbakht is a scientist, engineer and chemist, working in particular with nanoparticles; she is also a poet, activist and philosophical researcher.

Nanoparticle research
Javanbakht has worked on a variety of projects exploring the properties of hydrogels, catalysts and using scanning microscopy and other techniques. Research papers include:
 Related physicochemical, rheological, and dielectric properties of nanocomposites of superparamagnetic iron oxide nanoparticles with polyethyleneglycol
 Physicochemical properties of cellulose nanocrystals treated by photo‐initiated chemical vapour deposition (PICVD)
 Physicochemical properties of peptide-coated microelectrode arrays and their in vitro effects on neuroblast cells
 Relating the Surface Properties of Superparamagnetic Iron Oxide Nanoparticles (SPIONs) to Their Bactericidal Effect towards a Biofilm of Streptococcus mutans
 Charge effect of superparamagnetic iron oxide nanoparticles on their surface functionalization by photo-initiated chemical vapour deposition
 Solid state synthesis of carbon-encapsulated iron carbide nanoparticles and their interaction with living cells

Philosophy
Javanbakht is interested in epistemology and aesthetics. She has proposed a new theoretical framework, netism. She has also worked on the ethics of Rousseau and Voltaire.

Poetry and painting
Javanbakth has published nine volumes of poetry with publishers, such as Arvin and Novin Pajhoohesh publishers in Iran. Her first volume was called Iranian Songs in Seven Languages and she wrote poems in Persian, Turkish, Arabic, English, French, German and Russian for it. Her poetry has been published in several journals. Javanbakht's artwork is significant part of her practice and been exhibited in Canada.

Activism
Javanbakht has written widely about women's rights and human rights, with particular reference to the Middle East. She is a proponent of the idea that women should embrace polymathy in order to advance the struggle for women's rights, in particular being able to think and work in several languages. She spoke out in support of Shirin Ebadi, as a potential president for Iran in 2009. She also writes about human rights in Iran and believes that cultural and intellectual growth advances and empathy and understanding of humanity.

References

External links

 Taraneh Javanbakht
 Painting Exhibition by Taraneh Javanbakht

1974 births
Living people
Iranian activists
Iranian women chemists
Iranian women philosophers
Iranian women poets
Iranian women scientists
Shahid Beheshti University alumni